Mount Curtiss is a peak about  high at the east end of the main ridge of Gonville and Caius Range, Victoria Land. It was named after the seaplane tender the USS Curtiss which transported personnel to McMurdo Sound in Operation Deep Freeze II, 1956–57. Departing, she carried out wintering-over personnel of Deep Freeze I and construction party personnel left at Cape Hallett.

References
 

Mountains of Victoria Land
Scott Coast